The 2014 Kazakhstan Cup is the 23rd season of the Kazakhstan Cup, the annual nationwide football cup competition of Kazakhstan since the independence of the country. The competition begins on 22 April 2014, and will end with the final in November 2014. Shakhter Karagandy are the defending champions, having won their first cup in the 2013 competition.

The winner of the competition will qualify for the first qualifying round of the 2015–16 UEFA Europa League.

First round 
The draw was conducted in 2014 at the offices of the Football Federation of Kazakhstan. Entering this round are the 22 clubs from both the Premier League and First Division seasons. The matches took place on 23 April 2014.

Second round

Quarter-finals

Semi-finals

Final

Scorers
3 goals:

 Aslan Darabayev, Kairat
 Azat Nurgaliev, Ordabasy

2 goals:

 Oleksiy Antonov, Aktobe
 Marcos Pizzelli, Aktobe
 Ernest Sedko, Astana-1964
 Damir Kojašević, Astana
 Foxi Kéthévoama, Astana
 Miloš Trifunović, Atyrau
 Evgeniy Antonenko, Gefest
 Igor Burzanović, Irtysh Pavlodar
 Gerard Gohou, Kairat
 Miloš Lačný, Kairat
 Eugene Chikrizov, Kyran
 Vladimir Yakovlev, Lashyn
 Anatoli Bogdanov, Tobol
 Sabyrkhan Ibraev, Vostok
 Murat Tleshev, Taraz

1 goal:

 Abat Aimbetov, Aktobe
 Valeri Korobkin, Aktobe
 Yuriy Logvinenko, Aktobe
 Ihar Zyankovich, Aktobe
 Cícero, Astana
 Tanat Nusserbayev, Astana
 Sergei Ostapenko, Astana
 Marat Iskulov, Astana-1964
 Evgeny Panashenko, Astana-1964
 Guy Essame, Atyrau
 Sergey Gridin, Atyrau
 Dmitri Parkhachev, Atyrau
 Rustam Jahanov, Caspiy
 Roman Ablakimov, Gefest
 Yegor Levin, Gefest
 Marlan Muzhikov, Gefest
 Vyacheslav Serdiukov, Gefest
 Vitaliy Goloveshkin, Irtysh Pavlodar 
 Momodou Ceesay, Kairat
 Isael, Kairat
 Bauyrzhan Islamkhan, Kairat
 Aleksandr Kislitsyn, Kairat
 Josip Knežević, Kairat
 Ermek Kuantan, Kairat
 Vladyslav Nekhtiy, Kairat
 Sito Riera, Kairat
 Artur Yedigaryan, Kairat
 Elmar Nabiyev, Kyran
 Erlen Bekmukhaev, Kyzylzhar
 Serik Dosmanbetov, Kyzylzhar
 Ruslan Kenetaev, FC Kyzylzhar
 Vitali Miller, Kyzylzhar
 Rimo Hunt, Kaisar
 Duman Narzildaev, Kaisar
 Alibek Buleshev, Okzhetpes
 Mikhail Gabyshev, Shakhter Karagandy
 Roman Murtazayev, Shakhter Karagandy
 Kamoliddin Murzoev, Shakhter Karagandy
Mihret Topcagić, Shakhter Karagandy
 Zhakyp Kozhamberdy, Taraz
 Desley Ubbink, Taraz
 Igor Bugaiov, Tobol
 Raul Jalilov, Tobol
 Aleksei Malyshev, Tobol
 Januzakov, Vostok
 Anton Moltusinov, Vostok
 Nikita Utrobin, Vostok
 Alisher Esimkhanov, Zhetysu

Own goal

Robert Arzumanyan (22 November 2014 vs Kairat)

External links 
 

2014
Cup
2014 domestic association football cups